Pupillaea is a genus of sea snails, marine gastropod mollusks in the family Fissurellidae, the keyhole limpets.

Species
Species within the genus Pupillaea include:
Pupillaea annulus (Odhner, 1932)
Pupillaea aperta (Sowerby, 1825)

References

 McLean J.H. (1984) Shell reduction and loss in fissurellids: A review of genera and species in the Fissurellidea group. American Malacological Bulletin 2: 21-34.

Fissurellidae
Taxa named by John Edward Gray